George Samuel Lax (2 January 1905 – 1975) was an English footballer who played in the Football League for Barnsley, Bournemouth & Boscombe Athletic and Wolverhampton Wanderers. After his playing career ended Lax spent time managing Irish side Bohemian.

References

1905 births
1975 deaths
English footballers
Association football forwards
English Football League players
Frickley Athletic F.C. players
Wolverhampton Wanderers F.C. players
AFC Bournemouth players
Worcester City F.C. players
Bohemian F.C. players
Bohemian F.C. managers